The Professor of the Environment at Gresham College in London, England, gives free educational lectures to the general public. The college was founded for this purpose in 1597, when it appointed seven professors; this has since increased to nine and in addition the college now has visiting professors.

The Gresham Professorship of the Environment was established in 2014, thanks to sponsorship by the Frank Jackson Foundation. It is only the second Professorship to have been created at the College since its establishment in 1597. The first person appointed to the chair was Carolyn Roberts.

Gresham Professors of the Environment

References

Further reading
 

Law
1596 establishments in England